The 1948 Chicago Cubs season was the 77th season of the Chicago Cubs franchise, the 73rd in the National League and the 33rd at Wrigley Field, as well as the first of many seasons to be broadcast on television on WGN-TV while keeping its separate WBKB telecasts. The Cubs finished eighth and last in the National League with a record of 64–90.

Offseason 
 October 9, 1947: Randy Jackson was signed as an amateur free agent by the Cubs.
 December 6, 1947: Don Elston was signed as an amateur free agent by the Cubs.
 Prior to 1948 season (exact date unknown):
Jim Pearce was released by the Cubs.
Carl Sawatski was acquired by the Cubs from the Boston Braves.

Regular season

Season standings

Record vs. opponents

Notable transactions 
 September 1948: Warren Hacker was acquired by the Cubs from the Shreveport Sports.

Roster

Player stats

Batting

Starters by position 
Note: Pos = Position; G = Games played; AB = At bats; H = Hits; Avg. = Batting average; HR = Home runs; RBI = Runs batted in

Other batters 
Note: G = Games played; AB = At bats; H = Hits; Avg. = Batting average; HR = Home runs; RBI = Runs batted in

Pitching

Starting pitchers 
Note: G = Games pitched; IP = Innings pitched; W = Wins; L = Losses; ERA = Earned run average; SO = Strikeouts

Other pitchers 
Note: G = Games pitched; IP = Innings pitched; W = Wins; L = Losses; ERA = Earned run average; SO = Strikeouts

Relief pitchers 
Note: G = Games pitched; W = Wins; L = Losses; SV = Saves; ERA = Earned run average; SO = Strikeouts

Farm system 

LEAGUE CHAMPIONS: Fayetteville, Clinton

Hutchinson club moved to Springfield (Missouri), July 21, 1948

References

External links 
1948 Chicago Cubs season at Baseball Reference

Chicago Cubs seasons
Chicago Cubs season
Chicago Cubs